Inocutis is a genus of nine species of polypore fungi in the family Hymenochaetaceae.

Taxonomy
The genus was circumscribed by Jean-Louis Fiasson and Tuomo Niemeläin 1984 as a segregate genus from Inonotus. They originally included three European species formerly placed in Inonotus section Phymatopilus, a grouping of species conceived by Marinus Anton Donk in 1974. Molecular data later supported the genus concept. Inocutis is phylogenetically close to Fomitiporella.

Description
Inocutis species produce annual fruit bodies. They are characterized by the absence of setae, the presence of a rudimentary granular core, and the presence of sclerified hyphae in the granular core. They have yellowish to brownish spores that are ellipsoid in shape, and non-dextrinoid. The hyphal system is monomitic, consisting of only generative hyphae. They all grow on deciduous substrates.

Species
 
Inocutis dryophila (Berk.) Fiasson & Niemelä 1984
Inocutis jamaicensis (Murrill) A.M.Gottlieb, J.E.Wright & Moncalvo 2002 – North America; South America
Inocutis levis (P.Karst.) Y.C.Dai 2000 – China
Inocutis ludoviciana (Pat.) T.Wagner & M.Fisch. 2002
Inocutis porrecta (Murrill) Baltazar 2010
Inocutis rheades (Pers.) Fiasson & Niemelä 1984 – Europe; Middle East
Inocutis subdryophila Y.C.Dai & H.S.Yuan 2005 – China
Inocutis tamaricis (Pat.) Fiasson & Niemelä 1984 – Africa; Asia; Europe; Middle East
Inocutis texana (Murrill) S.Martínez 2006 – North America; South America

References

Hymenochaetaceae
Agaricomycetes genera